Pasvik–Inari Trilateral Park is a continuously protected wilderness area in Finland, Norway and Russia. It consists of the Vätsäri Wilderness Area in Finland, Øvre Pasvik National Park and Øvre Pasvik Landscape Protection Area in Norway and the joint Norwegian–Russian Pasvik Nature Reserve.

Pasvik–Inari Trilateral Park was established in several steps: Øvre Pasvik National Park was created in 1970, the Russian part of Pasvik Nature Reserve was established in 1992, and the Norwegian part created the following year. The twelve wilderness areas of Finland in Lapland were all created in 1991 to protect both the natural wilderness and the Sami culture. In 2003 the national park was expanded and Øvre Pasvik Landscape Protection Area was established, creating a continually protected area spanning three countries.

References

Inari, Finland
Sør-Varanger
Pechengsky District
Protected areas established in 2003
2003 establishments in Finland
2003 establishments in Norway
2003 establishments in Russia
Norway–Russia border
Finland–Norway border
Finland–Russia border